Rhizostomae or Rhizostomeae is an order of jellyfish. Species of this order have neither tentacles nor other structures at the bell's edges. Instead, they have eight highly branched oral arms, along which there are suctorial minimouth orifices. (This is in contrast to other scyphozoans, which have four of these arms.) These oral arms become fused as they approach the central part of the jellyfish. The mouth of the animal is also subdivided into minute pores that are linked to coelenteron.

Edible jellyfish

Jellyfish species fished on a commercial basis for human consumption (both as a delicacy and for use in traditional medicine) are all from this order and include members of the families Catostylidae, Lobonematidae, Rhizostomatidae and Stomolophidae. The jellyfish are typically dried and/or salted. In China, which was the first country documented to use jellyfish as food, this has been practiced at least since the year 300 CE, but they are also commonly consumed in Japan (the largest consumer of jellyfish today), Korea and southeast Asia. Several countries outside Asia have also started catching and exporting these in recent decades.

Taxonomy
, there were 92 recognized extant species in Rhizostomeae. These belong in the following families:
 Sub-order Daktyliophorae
 Family Catostylidae Gegenbaur, 1857 -- 7 genera
 Family Lobonematidae Stiasny, 1921 -- 2 genera
 Family Lychnorhizidae Haeckel, 1880 -- 3 genera
 Family Rhizostomatidae Cuvier, 1799 -- 4 genera
 Family Stomolophidae Haeckel, 1880 -- 1 genus
 Sub-order Kolpophorae
 Family Cassiopeidae Agassiz, 1862 -- 1 genus
 Family Cepheidae Agassiz, 1862 -- 5 genera
 Family Mastigiidae Stiasny, 1921 -- 5 genera
 Family Thysanostomatidae Gegenbaur, 1857 -- 1 genus
 Family Versurigidae Gegenbaur, 1857 (empty taxa)

References

 
Discomedusae